Jerald Dwayne Clark (born August 10, 1963) is an American former professional outfielder. He is an alumnus of Lamar University and played for the Lamar Cardinals baseball team.

Drafted by the San Diego Padres in the 12th round of the 1985 Major League Baseball draft, Clark made his Major League Baseball debut with the Padres on September 19, and appeared in his final game on July 17, . Jerald's brother, Phil Clark, also played in the majors.

Expansion draft
On November 17, Clark was taken as the 7th pick from the Padres in the Colorado Rockies expansion draft .

Stealing home
In 1992, as a member of the Padres, Clark accomplished the rare feat of stealing home. Los Angeles Dodgers catcher Mike Scioscia and manager Tommy Lasorda went to the pitcher's mound to discuss strategy. In the meantime, Clark alertly realized they did not call time and sprinted home. This turned out to be a keen play by Clark and an embarrassing moment to the Dodgers.

External links

1963 births
Living people
African-American baseball players
American expatriate baseball players in Canada
American expatriate baseball players in Japan
American expatriate baseball players in Mexico
Baseball players from Texas
Beaumont Golden Gators players
Calgary Cannons players
Colorado Rockies players
Duluth-Superior Dukes players
Lamar Cardinals baseball players
Las Vegas Stars (baseball) players
Minnesota Twins players
Major League Baseball outfielders
Major League Baseball first basemen
Nippon Professional Baseball first basemen
Nippon Professional Baseball third basemen
Nippon Professional Baseball outfielders
Olmecas de Tabasco players
People from Crockett, Texas
Reno Padres players
San Diego Padres players
Spokane Indians players
Yakult Swallows players
Wichita Pilots players
21st-century African-American people
20th-century African-American sportspeople